Chahar Khaneh Sar-e Pain (also Romanized as Chahār Khāneh Sar-e Pā’īn; also known as Chahār Khāneh Sar) is a village in Layalestan Rural District, in the Central District of Lahijan County, Gilan Province, Iran. At the 2006 census, its population was 2,885, in 816 families.

References 

Populated places in Lahijan County